The men's shot put event at the 1996 World Junior Championships in Athletics was held in Sydney, Australia, at International Athletic Centre on 23 and 25 August.  A 7257g (Senior implement) shot was used.

Medalists

Results

Final
25 August

Qualifications
23 Aug

Group A

Group B

Participation
According to an unofficial count, 23 athletes from 19 countries participated in the event.

References

Shot put
Shot put at the World Athletics U20 Championships